Lonnie Bradley Holley (born February 10, 1950) sometimes known as the Sand Man, is an American artist, art educator, and musician. He is best known for his assemblages and immersive environments made of found materials. He was born the 7th of 27 children during the Jim Crow era and claims to have been traded for a bottle of whiskey when he was four. Holley's work is included in the representation of the Souls Grown Deep foundation.

Early life
Lonnie Holley was born on February 10, 1950, in Birmingham, Alabama, (during the Jim Crow era). From the age of five, Holley worked various jobs: picking up trash at a drive-in movie theatre, washing dishes, and cooking. He lived in a whiskey house, on the state fairgrounds, and in several foster homes. His early life was chaotic and Holley was never afforded the pleasure of a real childhood. Born the 7th of 27 children, Holley claims to have been traded for a bottle of whiskey when he was four.

Before beginning his career, he spent time digging graves and picking cotton. He claims to have been pronounced brain-dead after being hit by a car. He became a father at 15 and now has 15 children. Holley also worked as a  short-order cook at Disney World. He also did time at a notorious juvenile facility, the Alabama Industrial School for Negro Children in Mount Meigs.

Visual art career

Holley began his artistic life in 1979 by carving tombstones for his sister's two children, who died in a house fire. He used blocks of a soft sandstone-like byproduct of metal casting which was discarded in piles by a foundry near his sister's house. He believes that divine intervention led him to the material and inspired his artwork. Inspired to create, Holley made other carvings and assembled them in his yard along with various found objects. In 1981, he brought a few examples of his sandstone carvings to Birmingham Museum of Art director Richard Murray. The BMA displayed some of those pieces immediately and Murray introduced him to the organizers of the 1981 exhibition "More Than Land and Sky: Art from Appalachia" at the Smithsonian American Art Museum. Soon his work was being acquired by other institutions, such as the American Folk Art Museum in New York and the High Museum of Art in Atlanta. His work has also been displayed at the White House.

Holley also became a popular guest at children's art events, bringing blocks of the foundry stone for children to carve. He gets special pleasure from sharing his experience of learning to love oneself through creative activity.

By the mid-1980s his work had diversified to include paintings and recycled found-object sculptures. His yard and adjacent abandoned lots near his home became an immersive art environment that was celebrated by visitors from the art world, but threatened by scrap-metal scavengers and eventually, by the expansion of the Birmingham International Airport. In late 1996 Holley was notified that his hilltop property near the airport would be condemned. He rejected the airport authority's offer to buy the property at the market rate of $14,000, knowing that his site-specific installation had personal and artistic value he demanded $250,000. The dispute went to probate court and in 1997 a settlement was reached and the airport authority paid $165,700 to move Holley's family and work to a larger property in Harpersville, Alabama.

Holley's first major retrospective, Do We Think Too Much? I Don't Think We Can Ever Stop: Lonnie Holley, A Twenty-Five Year Survey, was organized by the Birmingham Museum of Art and traveled in 2003 to the Ikon Gallery in Birmingham, England. From May 2003 to May 2004, Holley created a "sprawling, sculptural environment" in the lower sculpture garden at the Birmingham Museum of Art as part of their "Perspectives" series of site-specific installations. The creation of the work was documented in the film "The Sandman's Garden" by Arthur Crenshaw and in photographs by Alice Faye "Sister" Love. Holley installed sculptural work for the exhibition Groundstory: Tales from the shade of the South, at Agnes Scott College of Decatur, Georgia, which ran at the Dalton Gallery from September 28 to November 17, 2012. In 2022, Lonnie Holley was named a Fellow and received an unrestricted cash award from United States Artists (USA), a Chicago-based arts funding organization.

Selected exhibitions 
Called to Create: Black Artists of the American South, National Gallery of Art, Washington, DC, September 18, 2022 – March 26, 2023, curated by Harry Cooper.

Music career

Holley's professional music career began in 2006  when he made improvisational vocal recordings, at the urging of Matt Arnett (son of William Arnett), in an Alabama church using just a keyboard and a microphone.
In 2012, he released his debut album Just Before Music on the Dust-to-Digital label, followed by Keeping a Record of It the following year. In September 2018, he released his third album MITH on Jagjaguwar. In April 2021, Holley released a collaboration album with Matthew E. White titled Broken Mirror: A Selfie Reflection. Also in 2022, he has begun to record his fourth album. In 2023, Holley will co-teach a course for the Pilchuck Glass School, with artist John Drury.

Critical acclaim 

 The Washington Post listed Just Before Music on its list of the Top 10 albums of 2013.
 Pitchfork gave Holley's 2018 album MITH a 7.9 out of 10 rating.
 Pitchfork gave Holley's 2020 album National Freedom a 8.0 out of 10 rating.
 Pitchfork gave Holley's 2023 album Oh Me Oh My a 8.5 out of 10 rating.

Discography
 Just Before Music (2012)
 Keeping a Record of It (2013)
 Live on the Modern World with DJ Trouble – April 2013
 MITH (2018)
 National Freedom (2020)
 Broken Mirror: A Selfie Reflection (2021) – with Matthew E. White
 Oh Me Oh My (2023)

References

Sources
 Dietz, Andrew (April 1, 2006 ) The Last Folk Hero: A True Story of Race and Art, Power and Profit. Atlanta: Ellis Lane Press. 
 Birmingham Museum of Art (August 13, 2004) "Do We Think Too Much? I Don't Think We Can Ever Stop: Lonnie Holley, A Twenty-Five Year Survey" Exhibition announcement. Holley Retrospective - accessed April 16, 2006
 Reeves, Jay (February 8, 1997) "Acclaimed folk artist losing fight against FAA and urban sprawl." Associated Press.  - accessed April 16, 2006
 Discogs : Lonnie Holley  - accessed September 23, 2022
 Souls Grown Deep, Lonnie Holley: About.  - accessed September 23, 2022

American male sculptors
American installation artists
1950 births
Living people
Artists from Birmingham, Alabama
African-American sculptors
21st-century African-American artists
20th-century African-American artists
20th-century African-American musicians
Sculptors from Alabama
Musicians from Birmingham, Alabama
20th-century American sculptors
20th-century American male artists
21st-century American sculptors
21st-century American male artists
21st-century American male musicians
21st-century American musicians